State Route 99 or SR 99 is a  state highway in the U.S. state of Arizona.

Route description
SR 99 starts in Leupp on the Navajo Nation and heads south to Interstate 40 west of Winslow. From there, the route runs concurrently with I-40, then exiting I-40 in Winslow onto Business Spur 40. In downtown Winslow, SR 99 heads south on SR 87 before separating from it outside of the city. The route heads towards the edge of the Apache Forest, where state maintenance ends.

History
The route was defined by the Arizona Department of Transportation in 1968 as State Route 99. A designation of the nearby State Route 377 was deleted in 1983 and added to SR 99. Since then, there have not been any major realignments of the route.

Gallery

Major intersections

References

External links

099
Transportation in Navajo County, Arizona
Transportation in Coconino County, Arizona
Winslow, Arizona